Grachyovka is the name of several rural localities in Russia.

Republic of Bashkortostan
As of 2010, one rural locality in the Republic of Bashkortostan bears this name:
Grachyovka, Republic of Bashkortostan, a village in Shaymuratovsky Selsoviet of Karmaskalinsky District

Belgorod Oblast
As of 2010, one rural locality in Belgorod Oblast bears this name:
Grachyovka, Belgorod Oblast, a selo in Novooskolsky District

Kaliningrad Oblast
As of 2010, one rural locality in Kaliningrad Oblast bears this name:
Grachyovka, Kaliningrad Oblast, a settlement in Krasnotorovsky Rural Okrug of Zelenogradsky District

Kaluga Oblast
As of 2010, two rural localities in Kaluga Oblast bear this name:
Grachyovka, Mosalsky District, Kaluga Oblast, a village in Mosalsky District
Grachyovka, Zhukovsky District, Kaluga Oblast, a village in Zhukovsky District

Krasnodar Krai
As of 2010, one rural locality in Krasnodar Krai bears this name:
Grachyovka, Krasnodar Krai, a settlement in Umansky Rural Okrug of Leningradsky District

Kursk Oblast
As of 2010, two rural localities in Kursk Oblast bear this name:
Grachyovka, Fatezhsky District, Kursk Oblast, a village in Glebovsky Selsoviet of Fatezhsky District
Grachyovka, Manturovsky District, Kursk Oblast, a village in 2-y Zaseymsky Selsoviet of Manturovsky District

Lipetsk Oblast
As of 2010, two rural localities in Lipetsk Oblast bear this name:
Grachyovka, Usmansky District, Lipetsk Oblast, a selo in Grachyovsky Selsoviet of Usmansky District
Grachyovka, Volovsky District, Lipetsk Oblast, a village in Naberezhansky Selsoviet of Volovsky District

Orenburg Oblast
As of 2010, four rural localities in Orenburg Oblast bear this name:
Grachyovka, Grachyovsky District, Orenburg Oblast, a selo in Grachyovsky Selsoviet of Grachyovsky District
Grachyovka, Krasnogvardeysky District, Orenburg Oblast, a selo in Yashkinsky Selsoviet of Krasnogvardeysky District
Grachyovka, Kurmanayevsky District, Orenburg Oblast, a selo in Grachyovsky Selsoviet of Kurmanayevsky District
Grachyovka, Ponomaryovsky District, Orenburg Oblast, a settlement in Maksimovsky Selsoviet of Ponomaryovsky District

Oryol Oblast
As of 2010, nine rural localities in Oryol Oblast bear this name:
Grachyovka, Dolzhansky District, Oryol Oblast, a village in Uspensky Selsoviet of Dolzhansky District
Grachyovka, Khotynetsky District, Oryol Oblast, a village in Studenovsky Selsoviet of Khotynetsky District
Grachyovka, Orlovsky District, Oryol Oblast, a village in Bolshekulikovsky Selsoviet of Orlovsky District
Grachyovka, Ivanovsky Selsoviet, Pokrovsky District, Oryol Oblast, a village in Ivanovsky Selsoviet of Pokrovsky District
Grachyovka, Stolbetsky Selsoviet, Pokrovsky District, Oryol Oblast, a village in Stolbetsky Selsoviet of Pokrovsky District
Grachyovka, Uritsky District, Oryol Oblast, a village in Arkhangelsky Selsoviet of Uritsky District
Grachyovka, Verkhovsky District, Oryol Oblast, a settlement in Vasilyevsky Selsoviet of Verkhovsky District
Grachyovka, Bortnovsky Selsoviet, Zalegoshchensky District, Oryol Oblast, a khutor in Bortnovsky Selsoviet of Zalegoshchensky District
Grachyovka, Grachyovsky Selsoviet, Zalegoshchensky District, Oryol Oblast, a selo in Grachyovsky Selsoviet of Zalegoshchensky District

Penza Oblast
As of 2010, one rural locality in Penza Oblast bears this name:
Grachyovka, Penza Oblast, a village in Potodeyevsky Selsoviet of Narovchatsky District

Ryazan Oblast
As of 2010, three rural localities in Ryazan Oblast bear this name:
Grachyovka, Korablinsky District, Ryazan Oblast, a village in Kovalinsky Rural Okrug of Korablinsky District
Grachyovka, Sasovsky District, Ryazan Oblast, a settlement in Pridorozhny Rural Okrug of Sasovsky District
Grachyovka, Zakharovsky District, Ryazan Oblast, a village in Dobro-Pchelsky Rural Okrug of Zakharovsky District

Samara Oblast
As of 2010, three rural localities in Samara Oblast bear this name:
Grachyovka, Kinelsky District, Samara Oblast, a selo in Kinelsky District
Grachyovka, Koshkinsky District, Samara Oblast, a selo in Koshkinsky District
Grachyovka, Krasnoyarsky District, Samara Oblast, a settlement in Krasnoyarsky District

Saratov Oblast
As of 2010, two rural localities in Saratov Oblast bear this name:
Grachyovka, Arkadaksky District, Saratov Oblast, a selo in Arkadaksky District
Grachyovka, Petrovsky District, Saratov Oblast, a selo in Petrovsky District

Stavropol Krai
As of 2010, one rural locality in Stavropol Krai bears this name:
Grachyovka, Stavropol Krai, a selo in Grachyovsky Selsoviet of Grachyovsky District

Tambov Oblast
As of 2010, two rural localities in Tambov Oblast bear this name:
Grachyovka, Mordovsky District, Tambov Oblast, a selo in Lavrovsky Selsoviet of Mordovsky District
Grachyovka, Pichayevsky District, Tambov Oblast, a settlement in Yegorovsky Selsoviet of Pichayevsky District

Tula Oblast
As of 2010, one rural locality in Tula Oblast bears this name:
Grachyovka, Tula Oblast, a village in Mikhaylovskaya Volost of Kurkinsky District

Ulyanovsk Oblast
As of 2010, one rural locality in Ulyanovsk Oblast bears this name:
Grachyovka, Ulyanovsk Oblast, a village in Yermolovsky Rural Okrug of Veshkaymsky District

Vladimir Oblast
As of 2010, one rural locality in Vladimir Oblast bears this name:
Grachyovka, Vladimir Oblast, a village in Vyaznikovsky District